A course reader is a publication type used for teaching in universities and academia. A course reader is made up of a collection of existing texts, course slides, and notes. Common forms of course readers include photocopy packs or PDF documents. Course readers require copyright clearance.

References

Academic publishing